An employment website is a website that deals specifically with employment or careers.  Many employment websites are designed to allow employers to post job requirements for a position to be filled and are commonly known as job boards.  Other employment sites offer employer reviews, career and job-search advice, and describe different job descriptions or employers.  Through a job website, a prospective employee can locate and fill out a job application or submit resumes over the Internet for the advertised position.

History
The Online Career Center was developed in 1992 by Bill Warren as a non-profit organization backed by forty major corporations to allow job hunters to post their resumes and for recruiters to post job openings.

In 1994, Robert J. McGovern began NetStart Inc. as software sold to companies for listing job openings on their websites and manage the incoming e-mails those listings generated.  After an influx of two million dollars in investment capital he then transported this software to its own web address, at first listing the job openings from the companies who utilized the software. NetStart Inc. changed its name in 1998 to operate under the name of their software, CareerBuilder. The company received a further influx of seven million dollars from investment firms such as New Enterprise Associates to expand their operations.

Six major newspapers joined forces in 1995 to list their classified sections online.  The service was called CareerPath.com and featured help-wanted listings from the Los Angeles Times, the Boston Globe, Chicago Tribune, the New York Times, San Jose Mercury News and the Washington Post.

The industry attempted to reach a broader, less tech-savvy base in 1998 when Hotjobs.com attempted to buy a Super Bowl spot, but Fox rejected the ad for being in poor taste.  The ad featured a janitor at a zoo sweeping out the elephant cage completely unbeknownst to the animal.  The elephant sits down briefly and when it stands back up, the janitor has disappeared, suggesting the worker was now stuck in the elephant's anus. The ad meant to illustrate a need for those stuck in jobs they hate, and offer a solution through their Web site.

In 1999, Monster.com ran on three 30 second Super Bowl ads for four million dollars. One ad which featured children speaking like adults, drolly intoning their dream of working at various dead-end jobs to humorous effect were far more popular than rival Hotjobs.com ad about a security guard who transitions from a low paying security job to the same job at a fancier building. Soon thereafter, Monster.com was elevated to the top spot of online employment sites. Hotjobs.com's ad wasn't as successful, but it gave the company enough of a boost for its IPO in August.<ref>Rachel Emma Silverman (1999, December 10) 'HotJobs Plans to Show Its Hand With New Multimedia Campaign, Wall Street Journal (Eastern Edition),  p. B, 9:1.  Retrieved December 12, 2008</ref>

After being purchased in a joint venture by Knight Ridder and Tribune Company in July, CareerBuilder absorbed competitor boards CareerPath.com and then Headhunter.net which had already acquired CareerMosaic. Even with these aggressive mergers CareerBuilder still trailed behind the number one employment site Jobsonline.com, number two Monster.com and number three Hotjobs.com.

Monster.com made a move in 2001 to purchase Hotjobs.com for $374 million in stock, but were unsuccessful due to Yahoo's unsolicited cash and stock bid of $430 million late in the year. Yahoo had previously announced plans to enter the job board business, but decided to jump start that venture by purchasing the established brand. In February 2010, Monster acquired HotJobs from Yahoo for $225 million.

Job postings
A  job board is a website that facilitates job hunting and range from large scale generalist sites to niche job boards for job categories such as engineering, legal, insurance, social work, teaching, mobile app development as well as cross-sector categories such as green jobs, ethical jobs and seasonal jobs.  Users can typically upload their résumés and submit them to potential employers and recruiters for review, while employers and recruiters can post job ads and search for potential employees.

The term job search engine might refer to a job board with a search engine style interface, or to a web site that actually indexes and searches other web sites.

Niche job boards are starting to play a bigger role in providing more targeted job vacancies and employees to the candidate and the employer respectively. Job boards such as airport jobs and federal jobs among others provide a very focused way of eliminating and reducing time to applying to the most appropriate role. USAJobs.gov is the United States' official website for jobs.  It gathers job listings from over 500 federal agencies.

Metasearch and vertical search engines
Some web sites are simply search engines that collect results from multiple independent job boards. This is an example of both metasearch (since these are search engines which search other search engines) and vertical search (since the searches are limited to a specific topic - job listings).

Some of these new search engines primarily index traditional job boards. These sites aim to provide a "one-stop shop" for job-seekers who don't need to search the underlying job boards.  In 2006, tensions developed between the job boards and several scraper sites, with Craigslist banning scrapers from its job classifieds and Monster.com specifically banning scrapers through its adoption of a robots exclusion standard on all its pages while others have embraced them.

Industry specific posting boards are also appearing. These consolidate all the vacancies in a very specific industry.  The largest "niche" job board is Dice.com which focuses on the IT industry.  Many industry and professional associations offer members a job posting capability on the association website.

Employer review website
An employer review website is a  type of employment website where past and current employees post comments about their experiences working for a company or organization. An employer review website usually takes the form of an internet forum. Typical comments are about management, working conditions, and pay.  Although employer review websites may produce links to potential employers, they do not necessarily list vacancies.CIO - Top Sites for Researching Your Next Employer|url=http://www.cio.com/article/2387201/careers-staffing/top-8-sites-for-researching-your-next-employer.html 

Websites providing information and advice for employees, employers and job seekers
Although many sites that provide access to job advertisements include pages with advice about writing resumes and CVs, performing well in interviews, and other topics of interest to job seekers there are sites that specialize in providing information of this kind, rather than job opportunities. One such is Working in Canada. It does provide links to the Canadian Job Bank. However, most of its content is information about local labor markets (in Canada), requirements for working in various occupations, information about relevant laws and regulations, government services and grants, and so on. Most items could be of interest to people in various roles and conditions including those considering career options, job seekers, employers and employees.

Revenue models
Employment sites typically charge fees to employers for listings job postings. Often these are flat fees for a specific duration (30 days, 60 days, etc). Other sites may allow employers to post basic listings for free, but charge a fee for more prominent placement of listings in search results. A few sites use a pay-for-performance'' model, where the employer listing the job pays for clicks on the listing.

In Japan, some sites have come under fire for allowing employers to list a job for free for an initial duration, then charging exorbitant fees after the free period expires. Most of these sites seem to have appeared within the last year in response to the labor shortage in Japan.

Risks
Many job search engines and job boards encourage users to post their resume and contact details.  While this is attractive for the site operators (who sell access to the resume bank to headhunters and recruiters), job-seekers exercise caution in uploading personal information, since they have no control over where their resume will eventually be seen.  Their resume may be viewed by a current employer or, worse, by criminals who may use information from it to amass and sell personal contact information, or even perpetrate identity theft.

See also
 Career-oriented social networking market
 Freelance marketplace
 .jobs
 Job wrapping
 List of employment websites

References

 
Career development